William Scott Bowman, OC (born September 18, 1933) is a Canadian former National Hockey League (NHL) head coach. He holds the record for most wins in league history, with 1,244 wins in the regular season and 223 in the Stanley Cup playoffs and ranks second all time (behind Jean Béliveau's seventeen) for most Stanley Cup victories by a player, coach or executive with fourteen. He coached the St. Louis Blues, Montreal Canadiens, Buffalo Sabres, Pittsburgh Penguins, and Detroit Red Wings. He was most recently the Senior Advisor of Hockey Operations for the Chicago Blackhawks, until stepping down in July 2022. Bowman is regarded as the greatest coach in NHL history.

As head coach, Bowman has won a record nine Stanley Cup championships; five with the Canadiens (1973, 1976, 1977, 1978, and 1979), one with the Penguins (1992) and three with the Red Wings (1997, 1998, and 2002). He has also won five Stanley Cups as a member of an organization's front office. He was director of player development for the 1991 Penguins, Consultant with the 2008 Detroit Red Wings, and Senior Advisor of Hockey Operations for the 2010, 2013, and 2015 Chicago Blackhawks. Bowman is the only NHL coach to lead three teams to Stanley Cup victories. Bowman won the Jack Adams Award in 1977 and 1996. In the 1976–77 season he won a record 60 games, breaking his own record of 58 wins the year before. He broke his own record again in the 1995–1996 season, with 62 wins. His eight losses in 1976–77 are a modern record for fewest defeats incurred. His teams also made it to the Stanley Cup Finals a record 13 times and the semi-finals a record 16 times.

Early years
Bowman was born on September 18, 1933, in Verdun, Quebec, Canada. He played junior league hockey until a fractured skull resulting from a slash by Jean-Guy Talbot ended his playing aspirations.

Coaching career
Bowman started coaching, in 1956, as an assistant to head coach Sam Pollock with the Ottawa-Hull Canadiens in the Quebec Junior Hockey League. The following season, as head coach, Bowmans's team won the 1958 Memorial Cup. Soon thereafter, he moved into a coaching job with the Peterborough Petes of the Ontario Hockey League (OHA), the Montreal Canadiens' junior farm team.

St. Louis Blues
Bowman moved into the NHL in 1967 when he joined the expansion St. Louis Blues as an assistant coach under General Manager/Head Coach Lynn Patrick. However, Patrick resigned as Coach after a slow start, and Bowman took over at age 34. The Blues made it to the Stanley Cup finals in their first three years of existence as Western Conference (Expansion) champs. Bowman assumed General Manager duties after Patrick gave up that job in the summer of 1968. Bowman remained in St. Louis until the end of the 1970–71 season, but left due to a dispute with team ownership.

Montreal Canadiens
Bowman then joined the Montreal Canadiens as head coach. Though the Canadiens were the defending champions, Al MacNeil had been  fired as head coach due to accusations of favoritism toward the team's anglophone players. Bowman was hired in part because he is fluently bilingual in English and French.  His team lost in the first round of the playoffs in 1972 but won the Stanley Cup in 1973. The Canadiens would make the playoffs over the next two seasons but lost in the first and third rounds, as the rival Philadelphia Flyers won the Stanley Cup.

From 1976 to 1979, Bowman won four consecutive Stanley Cups with a talented Canadiens squad that included Guy Lafleur, Steve Shutt, Larry Robinson and Ken Dryden. Bowman's team won at least 45 games in each of his eight seasons.  However, after a falling-out with ownership, Bowman stepped down after the 1978–79 season.  The reason for the falling-out was the team's decision to pass him over as the new General Manager of the club in 1978 after Sam Pollock's retirement, as they hired Irving Grundman instead. The Canadiens' dynasty ended after Bowman and several key players left the team. Bowman remains second all-time in Canadiens history in both wins and winning percentage, behind Toe Blake in both categories.

Bowman and General Manager Sam Pollock not only presided over a Canadiens dynasty, but many of their players went on to have successful coaching and managing roles with their own teams.

Buffalo Sabres
For the 1979–80 season, he moved to the Buffalo Sabres as coach and general manager. He served as the team's general manager until 1987, doubling as coach on three separate occasions. During this time, he missed the playoffs for the only time in his coaching career, in the 1985–86 season. He left the Sabres as coach with the highest franchise win rate in their history. He has since been passed by Lindy Ruff.

Bowman joined the Sabres around the same time that their stars were growing old.  While the Sabres remained competitive for much of his tenure, he was unable to build them into anything approaching the powerhouses he'd coached in Montreal. Bowman resigned during the 1986–87 season and was replaced by Gerry Meehan 12 games into the season. He then become the color commentator for the CBC's Hockey Night in Canada usually alongside Don Wittman.

Pittsburgh Penguins
He became the Director of Player Personnel of the Pittsburgh Penguins in 1990 and was inducted into the Hockey Hall of Fame in 1991 as a builder.

In the summer, Bob Johnson, who had just won the Stanley Cup with the Penguins, was diagnosed with brain cancer, forcing him to step down, and died on November 26, 1991. Bowman took over as the team's head coach. Under Bowman, the Penguins repeated as Stanley Cup champions in a season dedicated to Johnson.

The next season, the Penguins had their first 100-point season in franchise history and finished with the league's best record. The 1992–93 Penguins under Bowman set the NHL record for consecutive wins in the regular season with 17. Their 119 points is still a franchise record. In the playoffs, the Penguins were upset in seven games in the Patrick Division finals by the New York Islanders coached by Al Arbour, a former Bowman player with the Blues.

After his two seasons as head coach in Pittsburgh, he was offered a long-term deal by the club. However, he indicated that he was not interested in their initial offer, which was not disclosed to the public, so they rescinded it. "We have to get somebody who wants to coach this team," Penguins owner Howard Baldwin said. "Scotty was clearly looking elsewhere."

Detroit Red Wings
In 1993–94, Bowman became coach of the Red Wings, and led them to a first-place finish in the Western Conference, but his Red Wings were ousted in the first round by the young San Jose Sharks. According to an apocryphal story, Bowman had difficulty in the maze-like tunnels of the San Jose Arena, eventually having to be rescued after getting lost and twice locking himself into rooms.

In 1995, the Red Wings made it to the Stanley Cup Finals, their first finals appearance in 29 years, but were swept by the New Jersey Devils in four straight. In the 1995–96 regular season, he won a record 62 games. However, they lost to the Colorado Avalanche in the Western Conference Finals.

In the 1997 playoffs, Bowman led the team to its first Stanley Cup in 42 years by sweeping the Philadelphia Flyers 4–0. The Red Wings repeated the feat the following season (1998) by defeating the Washington Capitals in 4 games.

In 1999 and 2000, they lost to the Colorado Avalanche in the Western Semi-Finals, and in 2001 they were eliminated by the Los Angeles Kings in the first round.

Bowman decided in February 2002 that he would retire at the end of the season and he went out as a winner as his Red Wings won the Stanley Cup by defeating the Carolina Hurricanes 4 games to 1. During the presentation of the Cup on the ice, Bowman put on an old pair of skates so he could take a lap with the Cup.  He then publicly announced his retirement from coaching. At the time of his retirement, he was second on the Red Wings' all-time wins list behind only Jack Adams. He is now third, behind Adams and Mike Babcock.

Bowman received the Wayne Gretzky International Award in 2002.

Team Canada
Bowman has coached the Canada men's national ice hockey team at the international level twice in his career. In the 1976 Canada Cup his team won gold over Czechoslovakia and silver in the 1981 Canada Cup against the Soviet Union.

Coaching record

Retirement
In 2003 Bowman was inducted into Canada's Walk of Fame.

Since his retirement as coach in 2002, Bowman worked as a special consultant to the Red Wings. On August 3, 2007, it was reported that Bowman was offered the position of President of the Toronto Maple Leafs. Bowman later appeared in an interview on Hockey Night in Canada on January 12, 2008, confirming that he was very close to taking the job only to be turned away by Richard Peddie, CEO of Maple Leaf Sports & Entertainment Ltd. (MLSE). In July 2008, he took a position as senior advisor of hockey operations for the Chicago Blackhawks to work alongside his son Stan Bowman, who was the general manager. The Blackhawks' Stanley Cup victory in 2010 gave Bowman his 12th Stanley Cup including coaching and team management, and the Blackhawks' 2013, and 2015 Stanley Cup victories were Bowman's 13th and 14th respectively. Bowman stepped down from his advisory role in Chicago on July 1, 2022, saying that "it was time to move on." 

In 2012, he was made an Officer of the Order of Canada "for his contributions to hockey as a coach and mentor".

On February 8, 2017, it was announced that Bowman would receive Order of Hockey in Canada award in a ceremony on June 19.

Personal life
As of January 2018 Bowman was living in Sarasota, Florida, attending all of the Tampa Bay Lightning home games in his role as the Senior Advisor of Hockey Operations for the Chicago Blackhawks, that was managed by his son Stan Bowman until October 26, 2021, when Stan resigned from the Chicago Blackhawks organization in response to the results of an independent investigation into allegations of sexual assault committed by a member of the Blackhawks' video coaching staff, Brad Aldrich. Stan also resigned as the general manager of the U.S. Olympic men's hockey team the same day.

References

External links
 

1933 births
Living people
Anglophone Quebec people
Buffalo Sabres coaches
Buffalo Sabres executives
Canada men's national ice hockey team coaches
Canadian ice hockey coaches
Canadian people of Scottish descent
Chicago Blackhawks executives
Detroit Red Wings coaches
Detroit Red Wings general managers
Hockey Hall of Fame inductees
Ice hockey people from Montreal
Jack Adams Award winners
Lester Patrick Trophy recipients
Montreal Canadiens coaches
National Hockey League broadcasters
National Hockey League general managers
Officers of the Order of Canada
Order of Hockey in Canada recipients
People from East Amherst, New York
People from Verdun, Quebec
Peterborough Petes coaches
Pittsburgh Penguins coaches
Pittsburgh Penguins executives
St. Louis Blues coaches
St. Louis Blues executives
Stanley Cup champions
Stanley Cup championship-winning head coaches
Edmonton Oilers announcers